DJ-Kicks: Chicken Lips is a DJ mix album, mixed by Chicken Lips. It was released on 3 November 2003 on the Studio !K7 independent record label as part of the DJ-Kicks series.

Track listing
 "Places of Light" - Brainticket (Bryer, Muir, Joel Vandroogenbroeck) – 3:46
 "Meaning of Love" - Karin Krog (Jon Christensen, Matthew Herbert, Karin Krog, Steve Kuhn, Steve Swallow) – 3:10
 "The Bubble Bunch (Original Jellybean 12” mix)" - Jimmy Spicer (Russell Simmons, Lawrence Smith, Jimmy Spicer) – 3:29
 "Shotgun" - Colourbox (Young) – 2:09
 "African Reggae" - Nina Hagen (Heil, Bernhard Potschka) – 4:01
 "Limitations" - Lindstrom (Hans-Peter Lindstrom) – 4:25
 "Wax The Van (Kenny’s Club Version)" - Lola (Lola Blank, Arthur Russell) – 2:47
 "Congo Man (Carl Craig Mix)" - The Congos (Roy Johnson, Cedric Myton) – 2:22
 "You’re Not Ready Yet" - Chicken Lips (Andrew Meecham, Dean Meredith) – 3:33
 "Seventh Heaven (Larry Levan Mix)" - Gwen Guthrie (Tamy Lester Smith) – 4:35
 "Treat Me (Dubmental Mix-A Pablovia RaBaN Mix)" - The Paul Simpson Connection (Paul Simpson) – 3:29
 "Music A Fe Rule" - Rhythm & Sound w/ Paul St. Hilaire (Mark Ernestas, Oswald Moritz, Paul Hilaire) – 0:22
 "Crisis" - Tik and Tok (Tim Dry) – 2:20
 Light Years Away (Dub)" - Warp 9 (Lotti Golden, Richard Scher) – 1:14
 "Beat The Street (Instrumental)" - Sharon Redd (Eric Matthew, Darryl Payne) – 0:18
 "Wind Ya Neck In" - Chicken Lips (Meecham, Meredith) – 5:26
 "Suckee" - Big Two Hundred (Meecham, Meredith) – 5:02
 "Animal Rhapsody (Dennis Bovell Mix)" - The Raincoats (Birch, Raincoats) – 4:42
 "Brazilian Love Affair" - George Duke (George Duke) – 4:37
 "Nice and Soft" - Wish & La-Rita Gaskin (Carmichael) – 3:47
 "Bad Skin (DJ-Kicks)" - Chicken Lips (Meecham, Meredith, Kotey, Crazy Girl) – 4:14

Personnel 

Bob Blank – Producer
Lola Blank – Producer
Greg Carmichael – Producer
Chicken Lips – Producer, Compilation, Mixing
The Congos – Producer
Carl Craig – Editing
Crazy Girl – Vocals
Lotti Golden – Producer, Mixing
Matthew Herbert – Producer
Jellybean – Producer, Mixing
François Kevorkian – Producer
Hans Peter Lindstrøm – Producer
Stevie Kotey - Producer
Andy Meecham – Producer
Dean Meredith – Producer
Lee Perry – Producer
Dave Rimmer – Liner Notes
Paul St. Hilaire – Text
Richard Scher – Producer, Mixing
Paul Simpson – Arranger, Producer
Arthur Storey Jr. – Producer
Fred Zarr – Producer

References

External links 
DJ-Kicks website

Chicken Lips
2003 compilation albums